James Wingfield Golucke (1865–1907), often known as J.W. Golucke, was an American architect based in Atlanta, Georgia.

He worked alone and also within partnership Golucke & Stewart. On his own he designed about 15 courthouses in Georgia.  With partner George Wilson Stewart (1862-1937) he designed five Georgia courthouses and other buildings such as the Fitzpatrick Hotel.  Little is known about Stewart besides that he practiced by himself after 1900, including acting as an assisting architect for the Candler Building during its 1903-1906 construction in Atlanta.

Many of Golucke's works, alone or with partners, are listed on the U.S. National Register of Historic Places.

Works
Works by Golucke or his firm include (with attribution):
Baker County Courthouse, Courthouse Sq. Newton, GA (Golucke,J.W. & Co.), NRHP-listed
Banks County Jail, Silver Shoals Rd. Homer, GA (Golucke,J.W.,& Co.), NRHP-listed
Bartow County Courthouse, Courthouse Sq. Cartersville, GA (Golucke,J.W., & Co.), NRHP-listed
Calhoun County Courthouse, 25 W. Eleventh St. Anniston, AL (Golucke,J.W.), NRHP-listed
Clayton County Courthouse, Jonesboro, Georgia
Coweta County Courthouse, Courthouse Sq. Newnan, GA (Golucke,J.W.)
Fitzpatrick Hotel, 18 W. Public Square Washington, GA (Golucke & Stewart), NRHP-listed
Henry County Courthouse, Courthouse Sq. McDonough, GA (Golucke & Stewart), NRHP-listed
Johnson County Courthouse, Courthouse Sq. Wrightsville, GA (Golucke & Stewart), NRHP-listed
Jones County Courthouse, GA 49 Gray, GA (Golucke,J.W.), NRHP-listed
Locust Grove Institute Academic Building, 3644 GA 42 Locust Grove, GA (Golucke,James W.), NRHP-listed
Macon County Courthouse, E. Northside and N. Main Sts. Tuskegee, AL (Golucke,J.W.), NRHP-listed
Madison County Courthouse, Courthouse Sq. Danielsville, GA (Golucke,J.W.,& Co.), NRHP-listed
Old Union County Courthouse, Courthouse Sq. Blairsville, GA Golucke & Stewart), NRHP-listed
Pickens County Jail, N. Main St. Jasper, GA (Golucke,James W.), NRHP-listed
Pierce County Courthouse, Main St. Blackshear, GA (Golucke,J.W.,& Co.), NRHP-listed
Pike County Courthouse, Courthouse Sq. Zebulon, GA (Golucke & Stewart), NRHP-listed
Rockdale County Jail, 967 Milstead Ave. Conyers, GA (Golucke,J. W.), NRHP-listed
Schley County Courthouse, GA 26 Ellaville, GA (Golucke & Stewart), NRHP-listed
Secondary Industrial School, 1112 29th St. Columbus, GA (Golucke J.W. & Co.), NRHP-listed
Twiggs County Courthouse, Courthouse Sq. Jeffersonville, GA (Golucke,J.W.,& Co.), NRHP-listed
Worth County Courthouse, Courthouse Sq. Sylvester, GA (Golucke,J.W.), NRHP-listed
One or more works in Cordele Commercial Historic District, roughly bounded by Sixth Ave., Sixth St., Ninth Ave., and Fourteenth St. Cordele, GA (Golucke,J.W., & Co.), NRHP-listed
One or more works in Covington Historic District, roughly Covington City S of US 278 Covington, GA (Golucke, J.W., and Company, et al.), NRHP-listed
One or more works in Crawfordville Historic District, roughly centered on the downtown business district of Crawfordville, GA (Golucke, Charle), NRHP-listed
One or more works in Newnan Commercial Historic District, Roughly bounded by Lee, Perry, Salbide, Lagrange, W. Spring, Brown, Madison, and Jefferson Newnan, GA (Golucke,J.W.), NRHP-listed
One or more works in Northwest Newnan Residential Historic District, Roughly bounded by RR tracks, Jefferson, Cavender, Duncan, and Browns Sts. Newnan, GA (Golucke,J.W.), NRHP-listed

References

19th-century American architects
1865 births
1907 deaths
20th-century American architects